Sympistis arizonensis is a moth of the family Noctuidae first described by William Barnes in 1928. It is found in the United States in southeastern Arizona as well as northern Colorado. It was formerly known as Oncocnemis arizonensis, but was transferred to the genus Sympistis in 2008.

The wingspan is about 33 mm.

External links
 With images.

arizonensis
Moths of North America
Moths described in 1928